Harri Heliövaara and Illya Marchenko were the defending champions but chose not to defend their title. The tournament was canceled prior to completion due to the coronavirus pandemic.

Seeds

Draw

References

External links
 Main draw

Nur-Sultan Challenger - Doubles